Sanremo is a 2020 Slovenian drama film directed by Miroslav Mandić. It premiered at the 2020 Tallinn Black Nights Film Festival in November 2020 and was selected as the Slovenian entry for the Best International Feature Film at the 94th Academy Awards.

Synopsis
Nursing home residents Bruno and Duša, both suffering from dementia, form a fragile bond.

Cast
 Sandi Pavlin as Bruno
 Silva Cusin as Duša
 Boris Cavazza as Dare
 Doroteja Nadrah as Jana
 Mojca Funkl as Spela

See also
 List of submissions to the 94th Academy Awards for Best International Feature Film
 List of Slovenian submissions for the Academy Award for Best International Feature Film

References

External links
 

2020 films
2020 drama films
Slovenian drama films
Slovene-language films
Films about old age
Films about dementia